The following is a list of water parks in Africa sorted by region.

Algeria
 Aquapalm, Biskra
 Aquafortland, Algiers
 Aqualand Waterpark, Djerma

Egypt
 Jungle Aqua Park, Hurghada
 Aqua Blu, Sharm el-Sheikh
 Cleo Park, Sharm el-Sheikh
 Aqua Park, Obour (city)

Morocco
 Tamaris Aqua park, Casablanca
 Oasiria, Marrakech
 Hotel Aqua Fun, Marrakech
Aqua Pirate, kénitra
Eden Aquapark, Marrakech
Smir AquaPark, M'diq
Aqualand, Meknes
Aquaparc Alpamare, Saïdia
MNAR PARK, Tangier
Atlas Amadil Beach Aqua Sun, Agadir
LabrandaTarga Club Aqua Parc, Marrakech

Nigeria
Recreation Garden With Water Park, Atan OTA 
Water Park Watermania Ibom, Idu
Park Vega, Agbor
Splash Park World, Kaduna
Splash World, Ikogosi
Tinapa water park, Calabar

Tunisia
 Acqua Palace, Hammam Sousse
 Carthage land les berges du lac, Tunis
 Squirty Fun Slippy Place, Carthage

South Africa
 Sun City Aqua Park, Pilanesberg
 uShaka Wet 'n Wild, Durban (part of uShaka Marine World)

See also
List of water parks
List of amusement parks in Africa

References

Lists of amusement parks
Africa-related lists
Lists of tourist attractions in Africa
Lists of buildings and structures in Africa